Sir Richard Symons, 1st Baronet ( – 4 July 1796), was a British politician.

Born Richard Peers, Symons was the only son of Richard Peers, of London, by Anna Sophia Symons, daughter and heiress of Richard Symons, originally of London, who had purchased The Mynde Park estate in Much Dewchurch, Herefordshire. According to the will of his maternal grandfather, he assumed the surname of Symons in lieu of his patronymic on succeeding to The Mynde estate.

From 1768 to 1784 Symons sat as Member of Parliament for Hereford. In 1774 he was created a baronet, of The Mynde in the County of Hereford.

Symons never married. When he died in July 1796, the baronetcy became extinct. Mynde Park devolved to Thomas Raymond, the grandson of his sister Ann, who also assumed the surname of Symons.

References

Year of birth uncertain
1796 deaths
Baronets in the Baronetage of Great Britain
Members of the Parliament of Great Britain for English constituencies
British MPs 1768–1774
British MPs 1774–1780
British MPs 1780–1784